The Great Debate, also called the Shapley–Curtis Debate, was held on 26 April 1920 at the Smithsonian Museum of Natural History, between the astronomers Harlow Shapley and Heber Curtis. It concerned the nature of so-called spiral nebulae and the size of the universe. Shapley believed that these nebulae were relatively small and lay within the outskirts of the Milky Way galaxy (then thought to be the entire universe), while Curtis held that they were in fact independent galaxies, implying that they were exceedingly large and distant.

The two scientists first presented independent technical papers about "The Scale of the Universe" during the day and then took part in a joint discussion that evening. Much of the lore of the Great Debate grew out of two papers published by Shapley and by Curtis in the May 1921 issue of the Bulletin of the National Research Council. The published papers each included counter arguments to the position advocated by the other scientist at the 1920 meeting.

In the aftermath of the public debate, scientists have been able to verify individual pieces of evidence from both astronomers, but on the main point of the existence of other galaxies, Curtis has been proven correct.

Arguments
Shapley was arguing in favor of the Milky Way as the entirety of the universe. He believed that "spiral nebulae" such as Andromeda were simply part of the Milky Way. He could back up this claim by citing relative sizes—if Andromeda were not part of the Milky Way, then its distance must have been on the order of 108 light years—a span most contemporary astronomers would not accept. Adriaan van Maanen, a well-respected astronomer of the time, also provided evidence supporting Shapley's argument. Van Maanen claimed he had observed the Pinwheel Galaxy rotating, and that if the Pinwheel Galaxy were in fact a distinct galaxy and could be observed to be rotating on a timescale of years, its orbital velocity would be enormous and there would be a violation of the universal speed limit, the speed of light. Shapley also backed up his claims with the observation of a nova in the Andromeda "nebula" that had briefly outshone the entire nebula, constituting a seemingly impossible output of energy were Andromeda in fact a separate galaxy.

Curtis, on the other hand, contended that Andromeda and other such "nebulae" were separate galaxies, or "island universes" (a term invented by the 18th-century philosopher Immanuel Kant, who also believed that the "spiral nebulae" were extragalactic). He showed that there were more novae in Andromeda than in the Milky Way. From this, he could ask why there were more novae in one small section of the galaxy than the other sections of the galaxy, if Andromeda were not a separate galaxy but simply a nebula within Earth's galaxy. This led to supporting Andromeda as a separate galaxy with its own signature age and rate of nova occurrences. Curtis also noted the large radial velocities of spiral nebulae that suggested they could not be gravitationally bound to the Milky Way in a Kapteyn-model Universe. In addition, he cited dark lanes present in other galaxies similar to the dust clouds found in Earth's own galaxy, explaining the zone of avoidance.

Curtis stated that if van Maanen's observation of the Pinwheel Galaxy rotating were correct, he himself would have been wrong about the scale of the universe and that the Milky Way would fully encompass it.

After the debate

Later in the 1920s, Edwin Hubble showed that Andromeda was far outside the Milky Way by measuring Cepheid variable stars, proving that Curtis was correct. It is now known that the Milky Way is only one of as many as an estimated 200 billion to 2 trillion or more galaxies in the observable universe, proving Curtis the more accurate party in the debate. Also, astronomers generally accept that the nova Shapley referred to in his arguments was in fact a supernova, which does indeed temporarily outshine the combined output of an entire galaxy. On other points, the results were mixed (the actual size of the Milky Way is in between the sizes proposed by Shapley and Curtis), or in favor of Shapley (the Sun was near the center of the galaxy in Curtis's model, while Shapley correctly placed the Sun in the outer regions of the galaxy).

It later became apparent that van Maanen's observations were incorrect—one cannot actually see the Pinwheel Galaxy rotate during a human lifespan.

Other Great Debates 
The format of the great debate has been used subsequently to argue the nature of fundamental questions in astronomy. In honor of the first "Great Debate", the Smithsonian has hosted four more events.

References

Bibliography

External links
 (The original publication of the debate.)
 (Resources related to the debate at the NASA website)

History of astronomy
Scientific debates
Physical cosmology
1920 in Washington, D.C.
1920 in science
Astronomy in the United States